Misono Station (美園駅) is a metro station in Toyohira-ku, Sapporo, Hokkaido, Japan. The station number is H12. It is located in the Tōhō Line.

The Tsukisamu Park is about 8 minutes walking distance from the station.

Platforms

Surrounding area
Tsukisamu Park
Japan National Route 36 (to Muroran)
Toyohira Ward Office
Post Office Misono
Otaru Shinkin Bank, Misono
Misono Toyohira Police Station

External links
 Sapporo Subway Stations

 

Railway stations in Japan opened in 1994
Railway stations in Sapporo
Sapporo Municipal Subway
Toyohira-ku, Sapporo